A Road Crime Unit or Pro Active Unit is a police unit derived from traffic policing departments in the United Kingdom.  Certain forces have established such units with a mandate to pro-actively target certain crime offences (robbery, burglary etc.) where there is likely to be a link to the use of a motor vehicle in the commission of the crime.

A popular example of this is Road Wars, a British reality TV series that follows police officers from the Pro Active Units from Thames Valley Police and Devon and Cornwall Police.

See also
 Road Policing Unit

Types of police unit of the United Kingdom